Now That's What I Call Music! 12 is the 12th edition of the Now! series in the United States, released on March 25, 2003. It debuted and peaked at number three on the Billboard 200 and has been certified Platinum. With an increased number of hip hop and R&B tracks on this volume, it reached No. 10 on Billboard's Top R&B/Hip-Hop Albums chart.

Critical reception
Allmusic gave the album 2 out of 5 stars, stating "It's what you would expect and nothing more," noting the prominence of pop, R&B, and hip-hop on the album's track list.

Track listing

 Nivea’s track “Don’t Mess with my Man” was the album version instead of the radio version which was labeled as “the Scorpio remix”.
 Amanda Perez’s track “Angel” is the album version as opposed to the US radio Mix also known as “D-Lo Urban Remix”

Charts

Weekly charts

Year-end charts

References

2003 compilation albums
Now That's What I Call Music! albums (American series)
Capitol Records compilation albums
Hip hop compilation albums